Alfredo Pedro de Almeida was a major from Portugal who served as Governor-General of Portuguese India from 12 Jul 1929 to 25 Aug 1929.

References

External link 

Alfredo Pedro de Almeida at Geneall

Governors-General of Portuguese India